Lecci is a commune in the Corse-du-Sud department of France on the island of Corsica. Its name comes from the Italian word for Holly Oak, which was an important resource for many years.

Population

Sights
Torra di San Benedettu
Torra di San Ciprianu

See also 
 Communes of the Corse-du-Sud department
 Former railway station

References

Communes of Corse-du-Sud
Corse-du-Sud communes articles needing translation from French Wikipedia